The 1993 South African Open was a men's tennis tournament played on outdoor hard courts. It was the 88th edition of the South African Open and was part of the ATP World Series of the 1993 ATP Tour. It took place in Durban, South Africa from 29 March through 5 April 1993.

American Aaron Krickstein, seeded No.5, defended his title that he had won the previous year, beating South African Grant Stafford in the singles final.

Finals

Singles
 Aaron Krickstein defeated  Grant Stafford, 6–3, 7–6(9–7)
 It was Krickstein's only singles title of the year and the 9th and last of his career.

Doubles
 Lan Bale /  Byron Black defeated  Johan de Beer /  Marcos Ondruska, 7–6, 6–2

References

External links
 ITF tournament details

South African Open (tennis)
Durban
Open
March 1993 sports events in Africa
April 1993 sports events in Africa
Sports competitions in Durban